Beckedorf is the name of several villages in Lower Saxony, Germany:

 Beckedorf in Schaumburg district
 Beckedorf (Celle district), a village in the municipality of Hermannsburg in Lower Saxony
 a village in the parish of Schwanewede in Osterholz district, see: Beckedorf (Schwanewede)
 a village in the parish of Seevetal in Harburg district